The 1983 Transamerica Open, also known as the Pacific Coast Championships, was a men's tennis tournament played on indoor carpet courts at the Cow Palace in San Francisco, California in the United States. The event was part of the 1983 Volvo Grand Prix circuit. It was the 95th edition of the tournament and was held from September 19 through September 25, 1983. The singles event had a field of 32 players. Second-seeded Ivan Lendl won the singles title.

Finals

Singles
 Ivan Lendl defeated  John McEnroe 3–6, 7–6(7–4), 6–4
 It was Lendl's 6th singles title of the year and the 38th of his career.

Doubles
 Peter Fleming /  John McEnroe defeated  Ivan Lendl /  Vincent Van Patten 6–1, 6–2

See also
 Lendl–McEnroe rivalry

References

External links
 ITF tournament edition details

Transamerica Open
Pacific Coast International Open
Transamerica Open
Transamerica Open
Transamerica Open